Geological history may refer to:
 Historical geology, or paleogeology is a discipline that seeks to reconstruct and understand the
 geological history of Earth, or;
 History of geology, the development of the scientific study of the origin, history, and structure of the Earth.